Temecula (Luiseño: Temeekunga) is a city in southwestern Riverside County, California, United States. The city had a population of 110,003 as of the 2020 census and was incorporated on December 1, 1989. The city is a tourist and resort destination, with the Temecula Valley Wine Country, Old Town Temecula, the Temecula Valley Balloon & Wine Festival, the Temecula Valley International Film Festival, championship golf courses, and resort accommodations contributing to the city's economic profile. 

Although Temecula is geographically closer to downtown San Diego than downtown Los Angeles, it is considered part of the Greater Los Angeles area. Temecula is bordered by the city of Murrieta to the north and the Pechanga Indian Reservation and San Diego County to the south. 

The United States Census Bureau defines an urban area located in the southwestern Inland Empire which is separated from the Los Angeles and Riverside–San Bernardino urban areas, of which Temecula is the principal city: the Temecula–Murrieta–Menifee, CA urban area had a population of 528,991 as of the 2020 census, ranked 81st in the United States.

History

Pre-1800
The area was inhabited by the Temecula Indians for hundreds of years before their contact with the Spanish missionaries (the people are now generally known as the Luiseños, after the nearby Mission San Luis Rey de Francia). Seven bands of Luiseño Indians inhabited the Temecula valley pre-contact: the Pechanga, La Jolla, Soboba, Pala, Rincon, Pauma, and San Luis Rey bands (presently, all of the bands except the San Luis Rey are federally recognized tribes). The Pechanga Band of Luiseño believe their ancestors have lived in the Temecula area for more than 10,000 years, though ethnologists think they arrived at a more recent date. In Pechanga history, life on Earth began in the Temecula Valley. They call it "'Éxva Temeéku", the place of the union of Sky-father, and Earth-mother ("Tuukumit'pi Tamaayowit"). The Temecula Indians ("Temeekuyam") lived at "Temeekunga", or "the place of the sun". Other popular interpretations of the name include "The sun that shines through the mist" or "Where the sun breaks through the mist".

The first recorded Spanish visit occurred in October 1797, with a Franciscan padre, Father Juan Norberto de Santiago, and Captain Pedro Lisalde. Father Santiago kept a journal in which he noted seeing "Temecula ... an Indian village". The trip included the Lake Elsinore area and the Temecula Valley.

1800–1900
Little is known about the early 1800s because Temecula records were destroyed in the fire that followed the 1906 San Francisco earthquake.

In 1798, Spanish missionaries established the Mission of San Luis Rey de Francia and designated the Indians living in the region as "Sanluiseños", shortened to "Luiseños". In the 1820s, the nearby Mission San Antonio de Pala was built.

The Mexican land grants made in the Temecula area were Rancho Temecula, granted to Felix Valdez, and to the east Rancho Pauba, granted to Vicente Moraga in 1844. Rancho Little Temecula was made in 1845 to Luiseño Pablo Apis, one of the few former mission converts to be given a land grant. It was fertile well watered land at the southern end of the valley, which included the village of Temecula. A fourth grant, known as Rancho Santa Rosa, was made to Juan Moreno in 1846, and was in the hills to the west of Temecula.

On December 6, 1846, at the Battle of San Pasqual, Andrés Pico led Californios to kill over twenty of U.S. General Stephen W. Kearny's men. Subsequently, in January 1847, José Lugo with Cahuilla Indians came to the Temecula Valley in pursuit of the Luiseño Indians and killed an unknown number, about 40-100 of them, reportedly, in the canyon just west of the current Vail Lake Dam.

As American settlers moved into the area after the war, conflict with the native tribes increased. A treaty was signed in the Magee Store in Temecula in 1852, but was never ratified by the United States Senate. In addition, the Luiseños challenged the Mexican land grant claims, as, under Mexican law, the land was held in trust to be distributed to the local Indian tribes after becoming subjects. They challenged the Apis claim to the Little Temecula Rancho by taking the case to the 1851 California Land Commission. On November 15, 1853, the commission rejected the Luiseño claim; an appeal in 1856 to the district court was found to be in favor of the heirs of Pablo Apis (he had died in late 1853 or early 1854). The Luiseño of Temecula village remained on the south side of Temecula Creek when the Apis grant was acquired by Louis Wolf in 1872; they were evicted in 1875.

A stagecoach line started a local route from Warner Ranch to Colton in 1857 that passed through the Temecula Valley. Within a year, the Butterfield Overland Mail stagecoach line, with a route between St. Louis, Missouri, and San Francisco, stopped at Temecula's Magee Store. On April 22, 1859, the first inland Southern California post office was established in Temecula in the Magee Store. This was the second post office in the state, the first being located in San Francisco. The Temecula post office was moved in the ensuing years; its present locations are the seventh and eighth sites occupied. The American Civil War put an end to the Butterfield Overland Stage Service, but stage service continued on the route under other stage companies until the railroad reached Fort Yuma in 1877.

In 1862, Louis Wolf, a Temecula merchant and postmaster, married Ramona Place, who was mixed-race and half Indian. Author Helen Hunt Jackson spent time with Louis and Ramona Wolf in 1882 and again in 1883. Wolf's store became an inspiration for Jackson's fictional "Hartsel's store" in her 1884 novel, Ramona.

Also in 1882, the California Southern Railroad, a subsidiary of the Santa Fe Railroad completed construction of the section from National City to Temecula. In 1883, the line was extended to San Bernardino. In the late 1880s, a series of floods washed out the tracks and the section of the railroad through the canyon was finally abandoned. The old Temecula station was used as a barn and later demolished.

In the 1890s, with the operation of granite stone quarries, Temecula granite was shaped into fence and hitching posts, curbstones, courthouse steps, and building blocks. At the turn of the 20th century, Temecula became an important shipping point for grain and cattle.

1900–1989

In 1904, Walter L. Vail, who had come to the United States with his parents from Nova Scotia, migrated to California. Along with various partners, he began buying land in Southern California. Vail bought ranchland in the Temecula Valley, buying  of Rancho Temecula and Rancho Pauba, along with the northern half of Rancho Little Temecula. Vail was killed by a streetcar in Los Angeles in 1906; his son, Mahlon Vail, took over the family ranch. In 1914, financed by Mahlon Vail and local ranchers, the First National Bank of Temecula opened on Front Street. In 1915, the first paved, two-lane county road was built through Temecula.

In 1948, the Vail family built a dam to catch the Temecula Creek water and created Vail Lake. Through the mid-1960s, the economy of the Temecula Valley centered around the Vail Ranch; the cattle business and agriculture were the stimuli for most business ventures.

In 1964, the Vail Ranch was sold to the Kaiser—Aetna partnership.

In the 1970 census, the United States Census Bureau enumerated the population of the entire Murrieta-Rancho California-Temecula area at 2,769.

In 1970, the Temecula Town Association, a non-profit, charitable organization, incorporated. In 1977, the present-day Rancho California Water District was formed. On November 5, 1979, KRTM 88.9 FM went on the air in Temecula.

In the 1980 census, 10,215 people were enumerated in the area, a 269 percent increase from the prior census.

In 1984, the Temecula American Viticultural Area (AVA), the official designation for the local wine country (renamed the Temecula Valley AVA in 2004), was established. In 1985, the completion of Interstate 15 between the Greater Los Angeles area and San Diego began a subdivision land boom, making it possible to own a new home in Temecula and have a manageable work commute to San Diego County.

On December 1, 1989, Temecula incorporated as a city, with Ron Parks as the first mayor.

1990–present
In 1990, the first United States Census Bureau count of Temecula as a city enumerated 27,099 people. The 1990s brought rapid growth to the Temecula Valley. Many families began moving to the area from San Diego, Los Angeles, and Orange County, drawn by the affordable housing prices and the popular wine country.

From 1993 to 1998, Zev Buffman, and later with Dusty Rogers, son of Roy Rogers, promoted an historic district entertainment venue project renamed RogersDale U.S.A..

In 1995, the Pechanga Pow Wow began.

On October 27, 1999, the Promenade Mall opened in Temecula.

In 2005, Temecula annexed the master-planned community of Redhawk, bringing the population to 90,000. After a period of rapid population growth and home construction, the 2007 subprime mortgage financial crisis and the resultant United States housing market correction caused a sharp rise in home foreclosures in the Temecula-Murrieta region.

In 2012, the city and the Pechanga tribe successfully blocked a proposal by Granite Construction to construct a rock quarry south of the city. The Pechanga tribe purchased the 365-acre site for $3 million, now known as Pu'eska Mountain.

In 2013, the 140-bed Temecula Valley Hospital opened, providing the city with a full range of hospital services.

In 2016, the Vail Headquarters historic district opened in the Redhawk Towne Center shopping center, repurposing several historic buildings such as the Wolf Store for retail, dining, and entertainment uses.

Geography
South of the city, Murrieta Creek and Temecula Creek join to form the Santa Margarita River.

Climate
Temecula has a hot-summer Mediterranean climate (Köppen: Csa). August is typically the hottest month of the year with December being the coldest month. Most precipitation occurs from November to March with February being the wettest month. Winter storms generally bring moderate precipitation, but strong winter storms are not uncommon especially during "El Niño" years. The driest month is June. Morning marine layer is common during May and June. From July to September, Temecula experiences hot, dry weather with the occasional North American monsoonal flow that increases the humidity and brings isolated thunderstorms. Most of the storms tend to be short-lived with little rainfall. During late fall into winter, Temecula experiences dry, windy northeastern Santa Ana winds. Snowfall is rare, but Temecula has experienced traces of snowfall on occasion, some as recently as December 2014. A rare F1 tornado touched down in a Temecula neighborhood on February 19, 2005.

Demographics

2020 
As of the 2020 United States census, Temecula had a population of 110,003. The city's racial makeup was 55.6% (61,192) white (49.3% non-Hispanic white), 11.3% (12,458) Asian American, 4.7% (5,171) black or African American, 0.4% (472) Pacific Islander, 1.5% (1,643) Native American, 10.2% (11,179) of other races, and 16.3% (17,888) from two or more races. 27.6% (30,366) of the population were Hispanic or Latino of any race.

2010
As of 2010 Temecula had a population of 100,097. The racial makeup of Temecula was 70,880 (70.8%) White (57.2% Non-Hispanic White), 4,132 (4.1%) African American, 1,079 (1.1%) Native American, 9,765 (9.8%) Asian, 368 (0.4%) Pacific Islander, 7,928 (7.9%) from other races, and 5,945 (5.9%) from two or more races. There were 24,727 people of Hispanic or Latino origin, of any race (24.7%).

The Census reported that 99,968 people (99.9% of the population) lived in households, 121 (0.1%) lived in non-institutionalized group quarters, and eight (0%) were institutionalized.

There were 31,781 households, out of which 15,958 (50.2%) had children under the age of 18 living in them, 20,483 (64.5%) were opposite-sex married couples living together, 3,763 (11.8%) had a female householder with no husband present, 1,580 (5.0%) had a male householder with no wife present. There were 1,463 (4.6%) unmarried opposite-sex partnerships, and 186 (0.6%) same-sex married couples or partnerships. 4,400 households (13.8%) were made up of individuals, and 1,387 (4.4%) had someone living alone who was 65 years of age or older. The average household size was 3.15. There were 25,826 families (81.3% of all households); the average family size was 3.46.

The population was spread out, with 30,690 people (30.7%) under the age of 18, 9,317 people (9.3%) aged 18 to 24, 27,869 people (27.8%) aged 25 to 44, 24,416 people (24.4%) aged 45 to 64, and 7,805 people (7.8%) who were 65 years of age or older. The median age was 33.4 years. For every 100 females, there were 95.9 males. For every 100 females age 18 and over, there were 93.9 males.

The homeowner vacancy rate was 2.7%; the rental vacancy rate was 7.1%. 69,929 people (69.9% of the population) lived in owner-occupied housing units and 30,039 people (30.0%) lived in rental housing units.

The U.S. Census Bureau's American Community Survey reported an estimated 1.5% of the population of Temecula's working force, or 1,085 individuals, were involved with the U.S. Armed Forces as of 2011. This figure is slightly higher than the 2011 estimated national average of 0.5%.

During 2013–2017, Temecula had a median household income of $87,115, with 6.8% of the population living below the federal poverty line. In 2017, Temecula had an estimated average household income of $97,573. According to the Temecula Office of Economic Development, the city has an actual average household income of $103,945 in 2019.

According to the United States Census Bureau, the percentage of city residents holding a bachelor's degree or higher during 2013-2017 was 32.1%.

2000
In 2000 the population was 57,716, with 18,293 households and 15,164 families. The racial makeup of the city was 78.9% White, 3.4% African American, 0.9% Native American, 4.7% Asian, 0.3% Pacific Islander, 7.4% from other races, and 4.4% from two or more races. Hispanic or Latino of any race were 19.0% of the population.

There were 18,293 households, out of which 52.4% had children under the age of 18 living with them, 68.8% were married couples living together, 10.0% had a female householder with no husband present, and 17.1% were non-families. 12.6% of all households were made up of individuals, and 3.5% had someone living alone who was 65 years of age or older. The average household size was 3.2 and the average family size was 3.5.

In the city, the population was spread out, with 34.7% under the age of 18, 7.8% from 18 to 24, 33.3% from 25 to 44, 17.2% from 45 to 64, and 7.1% who were 65 years of age or older. The median age was 31 years. The above-average number of young people in Temecula was attributed to an influx of middle-class families came to buy homes in the 1990s real estate boom. For every 100 females, there were 97.6 males. For every 100 females age 18 and over, there were 94.2 males.

According to a 2007 estimate, the median income for a household in the city was $75,335, and the median income for a family was $80,836. Males had a median income of $47,113 (2000) versus $31,608 (2000) for females. The per capita income for the city was $24,312 (2003). About 5.6% of families and 6.7% of the population were below the poverty line, including 7.1% of those under age 18 and 3.2% of those age 65 or over.

Economy
Supported by high median and mean income levels, the city is a prominent tourist destination, with the Temecula Valley Wine Country, Old Town Temecula, the Temecula Valley Polo Club, the Temecula Valley Balloon & Wine Festival, the Temecula Valley International Film Festival, championship golf courses, and resorts. Other key economic sectors are education, professional, finance, and retail.

Top employers
, the top employers in the city were:

Tourism

Wine Country
The wine country is a few miles east of Old Town Temecula. The annual Temecula Valley Balloon & Wine Festival, held at nearby Lake Skinner, offers live entertainment, hot air balloon rides, and wine tasting.

Golf
There are several local golf courses, including Pechanga's Journey, Redhawk, Temecula Creek Inn, The Legends Golf Club at Temeku Hills, CrossCreek, Pala Mesa Resort (near Fallbrook) and The Golf Club at Rancho California (in nearby Murrieta).

Old Town Temecula

Old Town Temecula, the city's downtown district, is a collection of historic buildings, hotels, museums, event centers, specialty food stores, restaurants, boutiques, gift and collectible stores, and antique dealers. On Saturdays, Old Town has an outdoor farmers' market featuring approximately 70 to 80 local vendors. Old Town is also home to special events like the Rod Run car show, Art and Street Painting Festival, Santa's Electric Parade Show, western days, and summer entertainment. Old Town also hosts a growing nightlife.

Old Town is also home to the Temecula Valley Museum, which features exhibits about the local band of Native Americans and the local natural history and city development. The City Hall is located in the center of Old Town.

Old Town has the Old Town Temecula Community Theater, a 354-seat proscenium theater as well as The Merc, a 48-seat blackbox performance venue adjacent to the main theater.

Pechanga Resort and Casino
In 2002, the Pechanga Band of Luiseño Indians opened the $262 million Pechanga Resort & Casino outside city limits. It employs 5,000 people and is Temecula Valley's largest employer.

Festivals
 Temecula Bluegrass Festival
 Temecula Valley Balloon & Wine Festival
 Temecula Valley International Film and Music Festival
 Temecula Valley International Jazz Festival
 Temecula Street Painting Festival
 Temecula Greek Festival
 Taste of Temecula Valley

Sports
Temecula is home to the Temecula Valley Inline Hockey Association (TVIHA), a local inline hockey organization that provides school and recreational programs.

Temecula is also known as the home for the Freestyle Motocross group Metal Mulisha with members such as Brian Deegan, Jeremy "Twitch" Stenberg, and Ronnie Faisst living in or near Temecula.
   
Since 2012, Temecula has also been home to the Wine Town Rollers (WTR) roller derby league.

Currently, Temecula is home to a semi-pro soccer team, Temecula FC (a.k.a. the Quails). The area used to have another semi-pro soccer team, the Murrieta Bandits, in the 2000s.

Boxing and Mixed martial arts fight cards are held at Pechanga Resort & Casino.

Parks and recreation
Temecula has 41 parks,  of trails, and 14 major community facilities. In 2013, it was named a Bronze Level Bicycle Friendly Community and it was named a Playful City USA. Temecula's Pennypickle's Workshop was a winner of Nickelodeon's Parents' Picks Award for "Best Museum" and "Best Kids' Party Place".

Temecula's sports parks include the Ronald Reagan Sports Park (formerly the Rancho California Sports Park) and the Patricia H. Birdsall Sports Park.

Youth sports
Temecula offers various sport options as youth's extra-curricular activities such as football (both flag and Pop Warner), cheerleading, roller hockey, wrestling, basketball, baseball, soccer, and lacrosse. In 2010, the Temecula Mountain Lions Rugby Club was started. The club offers men's, women's, and youth teams. In their first season, the Temecula Mountain Lions Rugby Club's men's team won the SCRFU Open Division Championship.

Government

Federal:

State:

Local:
In the Riverside County Board of Supervisors, Temecula is in the Third District, represented by Chuck Washington.

Education

Public schools
Public schools in Temecula are operated by the Temecula Valley Unified School District (TVUSD), whose schools are consistently ranked as having the highest Academic Performance Indices within Riverside County. Great Oak, Chaparral, and Temecula Valley high schools have all received silver medals in the U.S. News Best High Schools rankings awarded by U.S. News & World Report.

The district's general boundaries extend north to French Valley, south to the Riverside/San Diego county line, east to Vail Lake, and west to the Temecula city limit.

Private schools
 Concord Lutheran Academy
Linfield Christian School
 Rancho Christian School
 Saint Jeanne de Lestonnac School
 Van Avery Prep

Charter schools
 Julian Charter School of Temecula
 River Springs Charter School
 Temecula International Academy
 Temecula Preparatory School
 Temecula Valley Charter School

Higher education
Temecula is home to Mt. San Jacinto College, a public community college. Mt. San Jacinto College relocated from a smaller site west of Interstate 15 after purchasing two five-story buildings from Abbott Vascular in 2018. The first phase of the nearly 350,000 square-foot campus opened in August 2021.

Temecula is also home to a satellite campus for California State University San Marcos (CSUSM), which offers several online and certificate programs. National University, University of Redlands, Concordia University, and San Joaquin Valley College also have education centers in Temecula. Temecula is also home to Professional Golfers Career College, a vocational school for those wishing to enter the golf industry.

Transportation

Highways
The Temecula area is served by two major highways: Interstate 15 and State Route 79.

Interstate 15 has three full interchanges in Temecula, and a fourth, French Valley Parkway, is partially constructed, with only the southbound off-ramp completed. Construction is expected to begin on a set of additional northbound lanes that would eliminate weaving near the planned interchange between Winchester Road and the I-15/I-215 split, but completion of the interchange itself, and the collector-distributor lane system that accompanies it, is not anticipated for several more years.

State Route 79 enters the Temecula area after passing Vail Lake, paralleling Temecula Creek for several miles, and it becomes a six-lane, city-maintained thoroughfare known as Temecula Parkway before it overlaps with Interstate 15. It leaves the freeway three miles later as Winchester Road (which is maintained by the city until it reaches the northern city limits) and continues north toward the cities of Hemet, San Jacinto, and Beaumont.

Major west-east thoroughfares in the city include Murrieta Hot Springs Road, Nicholas Road, Rancho California Road, Pauba Road, and Temecula Parkway. Major north-south thoroughfares include Jefferson Avenue, Ynez Road, Margarita Road, Meadows Parkway, and Butterfield Stage Road. Pechanga Parkway, which runs through the southwest portion of the city, carries the routing of County Route S16, although it is not signed as such within the city limits.

Public transportation
The Riverside Transit Agency bus system serves the Temecula area with Routes 23, 24, 55, 61, 79, 202, 205, 206, 208, and 217, as well as connections to Greyhound.

The possibility of extending Metrolink's 91/Perris Valley Line from South Perris to Temecula was considered in a 2005 feasibility study, along either Winchester Road or Interstate 215.

Airports
The French Valley Airport is located in the Temecula Valley. Temecula is also located within  of both the Ontario International Airport and the San Diego International Airport.

Public services

Cemetery
The Temecula Cemetery is operated by the Temecula Public Cemetery District. Land for the cemetery was originally donated by Mercedes Pujol in 1884 from the estate of her husband, Domingo Pujol.

Health care
Temecula is home to Temecula Valley Hospital, a five-story, 140-bed hospital that opened in October 2013. Temecula Valley Hospital is a member of Universal Health Services.

Kaiser Permanente and UC San Diego Health both offer services in Temecula.

Public libraries
 Grace Mellman Community Library
 Ronald H. Roberts Temecula Public Library

Public safety
Temecula provides police service in cooperation with the Riverside County Sheriff's Department via a contract with the department fulfilled through its Southwest Sheriff's Station, located in the unincorporated community of French Valley, just north of the city of Temecula, east of State Route 79 (Winchester Road). The station is adjacent to the Riverside County Superior Court's Southwest Regional Judicial District Courthouse and Southwest Detention Center, one of the five regional jails in Riverside County. The sheriff's station is currently commanded by Captain Lisa McConnell, who also serves as Temecula's Chief of Police.

The city of Temecula contracts for fire and paramedic services with the Riverside County Fire Department through a cooperative agreement with CAL FIRE. Temecula currently has five fire stations with five paramedic engine companies, one truck company and two CAL FIRE wildland fire engines.

American Medical Response provides paramedic ambulance transport to an emergency department.

Places of worship
The Temecula area is home to dozens of places of worship and various religious denominations, including:
 Calvary Chapel Bible Church, a  church and cultural center located in the Temecula Valley Wine Country.
Chabad of Temecula, a Jewish synagogue and community center serving all Jews regardless of affiliation.
 The Church of Jesus Christ of Latter-day Saints, representing what is thought to be the largest Mormon percentage community in California, the legacy of the San Bernardino LDS (Mormon) colony and settlement of the San Diego Mountain Empire as a part of the proposed State of Deseret in the second half of the 19th century.
 The Islamic Center of Temecula Valley, which is located in the northeastern part of the city.
 Reliance Church, located on Santiago Road east of Old Town Temecula. The church is built on the site of Temecula's first schoolhouse, which was built in 1889. The schoolhouse was converted into a chapel in 1915 and is still in use as part of the church.
 St. Catherine of Alexandria Catholic Parish, which was established in 1910 with a chapel built in Old Town Temecula in 1917. In order to make space for its growing congregation, the parish relocated and sold its formal chapel (now known as the Chapel of Memories) to the Old Town Museum for a dollar.

Sister cities
  Nakayama-Daisen (Japan; since 1994)
  Leidschendam-Voorburg (Netherlands; 1993–2019)

Temecula maintains international relations with Daisen, Tottori in Japan. Until 2019, the city also maintained international relations with Leidschendam-Voorburg in the Netherlands.

The city dedicated a Japanese Garden at the Temecula Duck Pond to honor the 10th anniversary of their relationship with sister city Daisen.

The Temecula Duck Pond is also home to an art piece entitled "Singing in the Rain". It was commissioned by the city of Leidschendam-Voorburg as a gift to the city to commemorate the resilient American spirit in the aftermath of the September 11 attacks. The piece depicts a mother and her children bravely pedaling a bicycle into the strong headwinds of a storm.

Notable people

 Nate Adams, freestyle motocross rider
 Tim Barela, comic strip author
 Maurice Benard, actor
 Rob Brantly, Major League Baseball catcher, attended Chaparral High School
 Allen Craig, former Major League Baseball first baseman and outfielder for the St. Louis Cardinals and Boston Red Sox, caught last out of the 2011 World Series
 Timmy Curran, professional surfer
 Terrell Davis, retired Denver Broncos Pro Bowl running back
 Brian Deegan, freestyle motocross rider and founder of Metal Mulisha, had an estate in Temecula; he put it up for sale in 2020.
 Hailie Deegan, NASCAR driver and daughter of Brian Deegan
 Larry Fortensky, last husband of Elizabeth Taylor<ref>{{cite web|url=http://in.news.yahoo.com/elizabeth-taylors-eighth-husband-faces-eviction-20110317-020000-102.html|archive-url=https://web.archive.org/web/20110321045734/http://in.news.yahoo.com/elizabeth-taylors-eighth-husband-faces-eviction-20110317-020000-102.html|url-status=dead|archive-date=March 21, 2011|title=Elizabeth Taylors eighth husband faces eviction - Yahoo! News|date=March 21, 2011|access-date=November 3, 2018}}</ref>
 Andy Fraser, songwriter and musician
 Erle Stanley Gardner, author, wrote over 100 of the Perry Mason novels at his Temecula ranch, "Rancho del Paisano" between 1931 and his death in 1970
 Sarah Hammer, professional racing cyclist and two-time Olympic silver medalist
 Christy Hemme, professional wrestler and manager
 Dan Henderson, mixed martial artist and Greco-Roman wrestling Olympian
 Reed Johnson, Major League Baseball outfielder
 Tori Kelly, singer and songwriter
 Troy Lyndon, CEO of Inspired Media Entertainment and developer of the first 3D Madden NFL game
 Cindy Marina, Miss Universe Albania 2019
 Margaret Martin, professional bodybuilder
 Julie Masi, member of the Parachute Club music group, resided in Temecula 1990-2005
 Sydnee Michaels, LPGA Tour golfer
 Trevi Moran, Youtuber and X-Factor contestant 2012
 Dean Norris, actor, best known for Breaking Bad Antonio Pontarelli, rock violinist, grand champion of NBC's America's Most Talented Kids Brooks Pounders, Major League Baseball pitcher
 Olivia Rodrigo, actress and singer-songwriter
 Stan Sakai, Usagi Yojimbo creator
 Taylor Tomlinson, stand-up comedian and podcaster
 Mark Towle, automobile customizer
 Kelsie Whitmore, professional baseball player
 Cassidy Wolf, Miss California Teen USA 2013, Miss Teen USA 2013
 Xenia, singer, appeared on Season 1 of The Voice Jerry Yang, 2007 World Series of Poker Main Event winner
 

In popular culture
 Temecula was the setting of a 1996 made-for-TV movie of couples visiting the area's wine country, entitled A Weekend in the Country directed by Martin Bergman and co-written by Bergman and Rita Rudner, with actors Rita Rudner, Christine Lahti, Jack Lemmon, Dudley Moore, Richard Lewis and Betty White.
 "Beachhead", the pilot episode of the 1960s TV series The Invaders, was filmed in part in Old Town Temecula and prominently featured the exterior of the historic Palomar Inn Hotel.
 Temecula was the setting of the 2009 comedy The Goods: Live Hard, Sell Hard.
 Temecula was the setting of a 2013 episode of Restaurant Express (Food Network) where the contestants operated pop-up food stands based on restaurants that would be suitable for the city.
Temecula is the setting for the Netflix reality series Car Masters: Rust to Riches.
The song "Temecula Sunrise" by experimental rock band Dirty Projectors off of their 2009 album Bitte Orca''.

See also

 Temecula Creek
 Temecula Valley
 Temecula Valley AVA

References

Further reading
  .

External links

 

 
Cities in Riverside County, California
Incorporated cities and towns in California
Populated places established in 1859
Populated places established in 1989
1859 establishments in California
1989 establishments in California